Terre Haute may refer to:

Places in the United States
 Terre Haute, Indiana
Terre Haute metropolitan area
Terre Haute Regional Airport
Terre Haute station (Amtrak)
 Terre Haute Township, Henderson County, Illinois
 Terre Haute, Illinois
 Terre Haute, Iowa
 Terre Haute, Missouri
 Terre Haute, Ohio

Other uses
 Terre Haute (play), by Edmund White, 2006
 Terre Haute (novel), by Will Aitken, 1989

See also

Haute (disambiguation)